McKenzie Lake is a suburban neighbourhood in southeast Calgary, Alberta. The community was in development from the mid-1980s through to present.  The area is bordered by Deerfoot Trail on the east, Stoney Trail on the south, Fish Creek Provincial Park on the west, and 130th Ave SE on the north. The community is most known for its private lake and island in the centre of the community. Multimillion-dollar homes can be seen along both the ridge and the lake.

History
The original community of McKenzie was built in 1984 south of Stonegate. During the mid-1990s, when town of Midnapore was annexed into the city of Calgary proper, interest in city's deep south began to peak. McKenzie Lake developed as an expansion of the former McKenzie community after an artificial lake was produced in response to the popularity of similar amenities in communities such as Lake Bonavista.

The community was expanded again in 1997 when Legacy Ridge was developed in a belt of agriculture land that separated McKenzie from McKenzie Lake, thus unifying the two areas.

Demographics

Residents in this community had a median household income of $97,291 in 2000, and there were 7.8% low income residents living in the neighbourhood. As of 2000, 14.2% of the residents were immigrants. Most buildings were single-family detached homes, and 6.3% of the housing was used for renting.

Education
This neighbourhood includes two public schools: McKenzie Lake Elementary School (K-4) and Mountain Park Middle School (5-9); and one separate school, Cardinal Newman School (K-9).

See also
List of neighbourhoods in Calgary

References

External links
McKenzie Lake Community Association

Neighbourhoods in Calgary